Keep It Redneck is a studio album by American country rap group The Lacs. It was released on August 20, 2013 via Average Joes Entertainment. It features guest appearances from Colt Ford, JJ Lawhorn, Noah Gordon and Sarah Ross. The album peaked at number 23 on the Billboard 200 albums chart in the United States.

Track listing

Charts

References

2013 albums
The Lacs albums
Average Joes Entertainment albums